Frederick William Butcher (14 August 1913 – May 1996) was an English professional footballer. A left back, he played in the Football League for Aston Villa, Blackpool and Swindon Town.

Career
Butcher began his professional career with Aston Villa in April 1931. After two League appearances for the Villains, he joined Blackpool in June 1936. He made four League appearances for the Lancashire club before joining his last known club, Swindon Town, in 1938. He made a total of 42 appearances for Town.

References

1913 births
1996 deaths
People from Hoyland
English footballers
Association football fullbacks
Wombwell F.C. players
Aston Villa F.C. players
Blackpool F.C. players
Swindon Town F.C. players
English Football League players